Thekon Bridge is a bridge linking Kyaunggon Township and Kangyidaunk Township on Yangon-Pathein Road in the Ayeyawady Division of Burma. It opened on Monday, 12 August 2001.  The Thekon Bridge was built in 10 months. It was built at a cost of over K 155 million. The bridge is 300 feet long and 28 feet wide. The clearance is 51 feet wide and four feet high and the reinforced concrete bridge can withstand 60 tons of load.

References

Bridges in Myanmar
Buildings and structures in Ayeyarwady Region
Bridges completed in 2001